Woodbury S. Grover was a member of the Wisconsin State Assembly.

Biography
Grover was born on December 3, 1830 in Townsend, Maine. On February 25, 1856, he married Angeline Potter. In 1858, Grover took his wife and their daughter, Floribella, to Dunn County, Wisconsin. There, he worked for Knapp, Stout & Co. and began farming. Grover would move to Dallas (town), Wisconsin in 1868 and to Ridgeland, Wisconsin in 1902.

In addition to Floribella, Grover and his wife would have twelve more children. One son, Warren, would become Postmaster of Ridgeland. Angeline died on March 20, 1918 and Woodbury died on January 28, 1927.

Political career
Grover was a member of the Assembly during the 1877 session. Other positions he held include Chairman (similar to Mayor) of Dallas. He was a Republican.

References

External links

People from Boothbay, Maine
People from Dunn County, Wisconsin
People from Barron County, Wisconsin
Republican Party members of the Wisconsin State Assembly
Mayors of places in Wisconsin
Farmers from Wisconsin
1830 births
1927 deaths
Burials in Wisconsin